Scarning railway station was located on the line between  and . It served the parish of Scarning, and closed in 1850.

References

Former Great Eastern Railway stations
Railway stations in Great Britain opened in 1848
Railway stations in Great Britain closed in 1850
1848 establishments in England
1850 disestablishments in England
Disused railway stations in Norfolk
Scarning